Paul Francis Jennings (20 June 1918 – 26 December 1989) was an English humourist and author. After his Catholic education, Jennings served in World War II. For many years he wrote a column, Oddly Enough, in British newspaper The Observer. Many collections of his work were published, including The Jenguin Pennings (whose title is a spoonerism) by Penguin Books in 1963. He also wrote popular children's books including The Great Jelly of London, The Hopping Basket, and The Train to Yesterday.

Jennings married Celia Blom in 1951 and died in 1989.

Early life and education
Paul Francis Jennings was born on 20 June 1918 in Leamington Spa. His parents were William Benedict and Gertrude Mary Jennings. He was educated at King Henry VIII school in Coventry and at the Douai Catholic school in Woolhampton, Berkshire.

Career

Jennings served in the Royal Signals during the Second World War. In 1943 his piece "Moses was a Sanitary Officer" was published in Lilliput magazine. Freelance work for Punch and The Spectator soon followed. Leaving the army with the rank of Lieutenant, he briefly worked as a scriptwriter for the Central Office of Information and then spent two years as an advertising copywriter; throughout this period his freelance work continued to be published.

In 1949 he joined The Observer, contributing a fortnightly column entitled "Oddly Enough" until 1966, when he was succeeded by Michael Frayn, who was an admirer of his work. After leaving The Observer, he continued to write until his death, mainly seeing print in Punch, The Times and the Telegraph magazine.

Style

His columns constitute several hundred 700-word essays. In general his pieces take the form of whimsical ponderings; some are based in real-life incidents, often involving his friend Harblow.
For instance, one of his pieces, "How to Spiel Halma", concerns their attempts to establish the rules of halma from the instructions in a German set using their extremely limited knowledge of the language.
His pieces are sometimes poems, and sometimes written in novel forms of language, such as the Romance-eschewing Anglish, or that of a toy 19-letter pipewipen (typewriter). Other articles were extended flights of fancy, such as "The Unthinkable Carrier" based on the idea of cutting Britain free of the Earth's crust so that it could float around the oceans and guarantee world peace, with the Isle of Wight kept in place by a tow chain. In a late 1950s piece, "Sleep for Sale", he prefigured the concept of the capsule hotel ("Over to you, capitalists. But remember, I thought of it first."). Several of his pieces touched on the invented philosophical movement of Resistentialism, a concept that probably owes some of its force to the contempt that Jennings—a devout Catholic—felt for the intellectual fashion he was parodying.

Jennings was an admirer of James Thurber, who attended a dinner party at Jennings' house and subsequently wrote of the conversation in a 1955 New Yorker piece.

Bibliography

Oddly Enough collections
 Oddly Enough (Reinhardt and Evans, 1950)
 Even Oddlier (Reinhardt, 1952)
 Oddly Bodlikins (Reinhardt, 1953)
 Next to Oddliness (Reinhardt, 1955)
 Model Oddlies (Reinhardt, 1956)
 Gladly Oddly (Reinhardt, 1958)
 Idly Oddly (Reinhardt, 1959)
 I said Oddly, Diddle I? (Reinhardt, 1961)
 Oodles of Oddlies (Reinhardt, 1963)
 Oddly Ad Lib (Reinhardt, 1965)
 I Was Joking, Of Course (Reinhardt, 1968)
 It's an Odd Thing, But... ( Reinhardt, 1971)

General collections
 The Jenguin Pennings (Penguin, 1963)
 A Precsription for Foreing Travel (sic) (Guinness, 1966)
 I Must Have Imagined It (M Joseph, 1977)
 Pun Fun (Hamlyn, 1980)
 Golden Oddlies (Methuen, 1983)
 The Paul Jennings Reader (Bloomsbury, 1990) (posthumous)

Books on British life
 The Living Village (Hodder and Stoughton, 1968)
 Just a Few Lines: Guinness Trains of Thought (London: Guinness Superlatives, 1969). About the Colne Valley, Scarborough–Whitby, Oxford–Fairford, and Neath–Brecon rail lines. With photographs by Graham Finlayson.
 Britain as she is Visit (M. Joseph, 1976)
 Companion to Britain (Cassell, 1981)
 East Anglia (Gordon Fraser, 1986)

Children's books
 The Hopping Basket (MacDonald & Co, 1965)
 The Great Jelly of London (Faber and Faber, 1967)
 The Train to Yesterday (Chambers, 1974)

Other
 Dunlopera: The Works and Workings of the Dunlop Rubber Company. Dunlop Rubber Co, 1961. About Dunlop; illustrated by Edward Bawden; not commercially issued. .
 And Now for Something Exactly the Same (Gollancz, 1977). A novel.

As editor
 The English Difference (Aurelia Enterprises, 1974) (co-edited with John Gorham)
 The Book of Nonsense (Macdonald, 1977)
 A Feast of Days (Macdonald, 1982)
 My Favourite Railway Stories (Lutterworth Press, 1982)

Personal life
Jennings married Celia Blom, daughter of music critic and lexicographer Eric Blom, in 1951. The couple lived in East Bergholt, Suffolk, England, and had six children. A keen chorister, Jennings sang with the Oriana Madrigal Society and the London Philharmonia Chorus. In later years he was an active member of the church choir at St Thomas of Canterbury church in Woodbridge. Jennings died on 26 December 1989.

Notes

References

1918 births
1989 deaths
British humorists
Royal Corps of Signals officers
British Army personnel of World War II
People from Leamington Spa
People from East Bergholt
The Observer people
The Times people
Punch (magazine) people
Anthologists